The  were a series of Japanese provincial land maps, created during the  Edo period, which the Tokugawa shogunate ordered be created by every province.

In 1983, two of these map sets—the Genroku Kuniezu and the Tempō Kuniezu—were designated Important Cultural Properties of Japan.

Shōhō Kuniezu

The original copy was destroyed by fire in 1873 :ja:%E6%AD%A3%E4%BF%9D%E5%9B%BD%E7%B5%B5%E5%9B%B3.

Genroku Kuniezu
Work on the  began in 1696 (Genroku 9) and ended in 1702 (Genroku 15). The cadastral survey and mapping project was started and finished in the Genroku era. It was the fourth official map of Japan.

The scale of the maps reduced "ri" (3927m) to 6 "sun" (18 cm) [about 1/21,600 scale].  Each map showed mountains, rivers, roads and other landmarks. Road milestones and names of villages with recognized yields of rice were recorded. Castle towns were recorded with the names of local area and names of the lords of the castles.

Some considered this set of maps as inferior to the previous ones which had been ordered.  The Genroku maps were corrected in 1719 (Kyōhō 4).

This was the first complete set of provincial maps that included both Ezo and the Ryūkyū Kingdom, which at that time, was a vassal state of the Satsuma Domain.

Tempō Kuniezu

Work on the  started in 1835 and ended in 1838.

References

Maps of Japan
Important Cultural Properties of Japan
17th-century maps and globes
19th-century maps and globes